The Silicon Institute of Technology, Bhubaneswar (SIT-BBSR) is a NAAC Grade A grade engineering institution with NIRF 2021 rank of 163  in Bhubaneswar, the capital of Odisha, India. Established in 2001 as an affiliated college of the Utkal University, the college has been an affiliated college of Biju Patnaik University of Technology, since 2002. Students are admitted to the college through the Joint Entrance Examination (main) merit list of Government of India. The college is accredited by the National Board of Accreditation and was granted autonomy by University Grants Commission (UGC) in 2017 for a period of 10 years. In 2009, Silicon Institute of Technology, Sambalpur was established as its sister institution.

Overview 
Since its inception, the institution has operated from its permanent campus at Silicon Hills, Patia in Bhubaneswar and at Silicon West, Sason, Sambalpur. Both locations have campuses with activities with more than two thousand students, about two thousand alumni and four hundred and fifty staff members.

The institution has a think tank comprising academicians, educational entrepreneurs, industry personnel and educationists.

Rankings

The National Institutional Ranking Framework (NIRF) ranked it 161 among engineering colleges in 2022.

Gallery

References

External links
 SIT website

Private engineering colleges in India
Engineering colleges in Odisha
Universities and colleges in Bhubaneswar
Colleges affiliated with Biju Patnaik University of Technology
Educational institutions established in 2001
2001 establishments in Orissa